Los Tarantos is a 1963 Spanish musical drama film directed by Francisco Rovira Beleta. It was nominated for an Academy Award in the Best Foreign Film category.

The film is based on the play La historia de los Tarantos written by Alfredo Mañas, and inspired by Romeo and Juliet by  William Shakespeare.

Plot
The love between two gipsies, Juana La Zoronga and Rafael El Taranto, from different families in Barcelona is thwarted by the enmity between their respective parents. Rafael sees Juana dance at a gipsy wedding, and is captivated by her beauty and charm, and they fall in love, aided by their younger siblings who are secretly friends and sympathetic to the young lovers.

Juana earns the respect of Rafael's formidable mother, Angustias, through her spirit and grace at flamenco, but her father Rosendo, an old beau of Rafael's mother, remains obstinate, despite the pleas of Juana, Rafael and Angustias. Juana's father offers her to his colleague, Curro, to make her forget about her romance with Rafael, but neither Juana nor Rafael can forget their love. Curro becomes arrogant, killing Rafael's friend Mojigondo, and beating Juana when he suspects she has been meeting with Rafael. Desperate, Juana seeks Rafael out in his dovecote and they make love, planning to elope the following day. But Curro, incited by Juana's brother Sancho, finds them together and kills them both. Rafael's brother subsequently hunts Curro down in his stables, and kills him.

Angustias and Rosendo are united in their grief, and Juana's younger brother comforts Rafael's younger sister, showing that the feud will not continue any further.

Cast
Carmen Amaya	 ... 	Angustias
Sara Lezana	... 	Juana
Daniel Martín	... 	Rafael
Antonio Gades	... 	Mojigondo
Antonio Prieto	... 	Rosendo
José Manuel Martín	... 	Curro (as J. Manuel Martín)
Margarita Lozano	... 	Isabel
Juan Manuel Soriano
Antoñita Singla	... 	Sole (as Antonia 'La Singla')
Aurelio Galán 'El Estampío'	... 	Jero (as A. Galán 'El Estampío')
Peret... 	Guitarist
Andrés Batista	... 	Guitarist
Emilio de Diego	... 	Guitarist
'Pucherete'	... 	Guitarist
Blay	... 	Guitarist
El Chocolate	... 	Cantaor
'La Mueque'	... 	Cantaor
'Morita'	... 	Cantaor (as 'Morità')
Enrique Cádiz	... 	Cantaor
'El Viti'	... 	Cantaor
J. Toledo	... 	Cantaor
Antonio Escudero 'El Gato'	... 	Juan/Bailaor (as A. Escudero 'El Gato')
D. Bargas	... 	Bailaor (as D. Bargas 'Lulula')
Amapola	... 	Antonia/Bailaora
'El Guisa'	... 	Bailaor
Antonio Lavilla	... 	Sancho
Francisco Batista
Carlos Villafranca	... 	Salvador
Josefina Tapias

See also
 List of submissions to the 36th Academy Awards for Best Foreign Language Film
 List of Spanish submissions for the Academy Award for Best Foreign Language Film

References

External links
 

1963 films
1960s musical drama films
1960s romantic musical films
Films set in Barcelona
1960s Spanish-language films
Films directed by Francisco Rovira Beleta
Films based on Romeo and Juliet
Fictional representations of Romani people
Spanish musical drama films
1963 drama films